Toltecalli High School, also known as Toltecalli Academy, is a public charter high school, located in Tucson, Arizona, United States.  Toltecalli High School is one of three high schools in the Calli Ollin School District, located in downtown Tucson, and is operated by CPLC Community Schools.  Founded in 2004, Toltecalli High School now serves approximately 150 students in grades nine through twelve.

External links
 CPLC Community Schools

References

Public high schools in Arizona
Schools in Tucson, Arizona
Charter schools in Arizona
Educational institutions established in 2002
2002 establishments in Arizona